is a railway station in the city of Gujō, Gifu Prefecture, Japan, operated by the third sector railway operator Nagaragawa Railway.

Lines

Station layout
Manba Station has a one ground-level side platform serving a single bi-directional track.  The station is unattended.

Adjacent stations

History
Manba Station was opened on 1 March 1955 on the Etsumi-Nan Line operated by Japanese National Railways (JNR). On 28 August 1986, operations of the Etsumi-Nan Line were transferred from JNR to the third-sector operating company Nagaragawa Railway.

Surrounding area
 Nagara River
 Dai-ichi Elementary School

See also
 List of Railway Stations in Japan

References

External links

 

Railway stations in Japan opened in 1955
Railway stations in Gifu Prefecture
Stations of Nagaragawa Railway
Gujō, Gifu